"Alone (One Person)" (Chinese: 一个人) is a song recorded by Chinese singer Lay (Zhang Yixing) which serves as the original soundtrack for the 2015 romantic comedy film Ex Files 2: The Backup Strikes Back. It was released on October 7, 2015.

Background and release 
Composed, arranged and lyrics written by Lay, "Alone" was officially released and disclosed to the public during a fan meeting at Shanghai Indoor Stadium which was coincidentally on his October 7, 2015 birthday.

Reception 
"Alone" ranked #1 on Baidu Music Chart and #4 on Billboard's China V Chart.

Chart

Accolades

References 

Chinese-language songs
2015 singles
2015 songs
Chinese music industry